Niels Laursen (11 April 1881 – 13 May 1944) was a Danish sports shooter. He competed at the 1908 Summer Olympics and the 1920 Summer Olympics.

References

External links
 

1881 births
1944 deaths
Danish male sport shooters
Olympic shooters of Denmark
Shooters at the 1908 Summer Olympics
Shooters at the 1920 Summer Olympics
Sportspeople from the Central Denmark Region